Season four of the television program American Experience originally aired on the PBS network in the United States on September 30, 1991 and concluded on February 17, 1992. This is the fourth season to feature David McCullough as the host. The season contained 13 new episodes and began with the first two parts of the LBJ film, "Beautiful Texas" and "My Fellow Americans".

Episodes

 Denotes multiple chapters that aired on the same date and share the same episode number

References

1991 American television seasons
1992 American television seasons
American Experience